Altaydyn Cholmony (lit. Star of Altai) is the main Altai language newspaper of the Altai Republic. It is printed 3 times a week.

The newspaper received the Order of the Badge of Honour.

Previous designations:
1922-1923: Кызыл солун табыш (Red News)
1923-1925: Ойрот јери (Oirot region)
1925-1948: Кызыл Ойрот/Kьzьl Ojrot (Red Oirot)

References

Newspapers published in Russia
Newspapers published in the Soviet Union
1922 establishments in Russia